Joshua Eagle and Andrew Florent were the defending champions, but did not participate together this year.  Eagle partnered Patrick Rafter, losing in the quarterfinals.  Florent partnered Andrew Kratzmann, losing in the first round.

Gustavo Kuerten and Nicolás Lapentti won the title, defeating Jim Courier and Patrick Galbraith 6–4, 6–4 in the final.

Seeds

Draw

Draw

References
Draw

Doubles
1999 ATP Tour